Mark Okoye II (born 15 June, 1986) is the Managing Director and Chief Executive Officer of the Anambra State Investment Promotion and Protection Agency (ANSIPPA) where he oversees all public-private partnerships and manages the state’s investment portfolio.

Early life

Childhood and Family 
Okoye was born in Lagos, Nigeria on June 15, 1986 to Chief Mark Okoye I and Chief Christy Nkem Okoye. His father Mark Okoye I, was appointed Nigeria's Minister of State for the Federal Capital Territory in February 1982 under the regime of Shehu Shagari GCFR and had been previously elected to the House of Representatives in 1979 at the age of 28. Okoye's mother is a former Nigerian bank executive director and a former Vice Chairman of the Abuja Municipal Area Council (AMAC).the age of 28. Okoye's mother is a former Nigerian bank executive director and a former Vice Chairman of the Abuja Municipal Area Council (AMAC).

Education 
Okoye had his secondary education at Atlantic Hall School. He attended the George Washington University, US where he graduated with a degree in Finance. He has since attended numerous executive education programs at the Harvard Kennedy School, and several other academic institutions across the world.

Personal life
Okoye is married to Philippe Mark-Okoye. The couple have two children.

Career

Private Sector 
Mark Okoye II began his professional career at Afrinvest Limited Lagos, Nigeria, an independent investment banking firm with strong presence in West Africa. There, he served as a Senior Associate in the Investment Banking Division. He distinguished himself working on several financial advisory and capital raising projects for clients across the public and private sectors. Okoye eventually quit his banking job to pursue a career in the public sector.

Public Sector 
In July 2012, Okoye was appointed as senior special assistant to the Governor Peter Obi on Investments.

At the age of 26, was entrusted with managing Anambra State's investment infrastructure, which led to the conceptualization of the Anambra State Investment Promotion and Protection Agency (ANSIPPA) – Anambra's first investment promotion agency, and he served as the pioneer Executive Director.

One year after his appointment, Governor Willie Obiano nominated him to become the Commissioner for Economic Planning, Budget and Development. However, this was rejected by the Anambra State House of Assembly due to the consititutional age limitation. 

On his 30th birthday, he was sworn in as the commissioner for Economic Planning, Budget and Development Partners, with a mandate to drive the development and execution of Anambra state's economic blueprint, medium-term strategic plans and annual budgets. His appointment made him the youngest Nigerian to be appointed a Commissioner since the beginning of the Fourth Republic in 1999, before the implementation of the Not too young to run law in 2018.

Awards and recognition
Mark can be described as a passionate, committed, and progressive public servant. He has been actively involved in the creation and execution of a wide array of policies, reform programs, and statewide investments which continue to address socio-economic challenges in Anambra. His work in public service over the past decade has earned him various recognitions from state, national and global organizations. 

 2019 Sub-national Awardee, Presidential Enabling Business Environment Council. 2019
 Member of Inaugural Cohort, Obama Leaders Africa Program, Obama Foundation. 2018
 Ten Outstanding Young Persons of the Year, Junior Chambers International. 2017
 Influential Young Africans in Politics under 40, MIPAD Organization. 2017
 Most Influential Young Nigerians in Politics under 40, YNaija.com Power list. 2017
 Young Person of the Year, The Future Awards Africa. 2016

References 

Living people
Nigerian Roman Catholics
Igbo people
Igbo politicians
21st-century Nigerian businesspeople
1986 births
Commissioners of ministries of Anambra State